Mikhail Naumenkov (born 19 February 1993) is a Russian professional ice hockey defenseman who is currently playing for Salavat Yulaev Ufa in the Kontinental Hockey League (KHL).

In his eighth year within the HC CSKA Moscow organization, and during the 2020–21 season, Naumenkov registered 6 points through 25 regular season games before he was traded to Salavat Yulaev Ufa in exchange for Nikita Soshnikov on 28 November 2020.

Awards and honors

References

External links

1993 births
Living people
Admiral Vladivostok players
HC CSKA Moscow players
Russian ice hockey defencemen
Salavat Yulaev Ufa players